Nicolas Wagner Ehlinger (born 2 January 1992) is a dressage rider from Luxembourg. He competed at the 2019 European Championships in Rotterdam. He competed as an individual for the 2020 Tokyo Olympic Games, finished 25th in the individual competition.

References

External links
 

Living people
1992 births
Luxembourgian male equestrians
Luxembourgian dressage riders
Sportspeople from Luxembourg City
Equestrians at the 2020 Summer Olympics
Olympic equestrians of Luxembourg